The Adventures of Little Carp (小鲤鱼历险记 Xiǎo Lǐ Yú Lì Xiǎn Jì) is a half-hour animated Chinese TV series adapted from the Chinese folktale "The Carp Jumps Over the Dragon Gate" (鲤鱼跳龙门). The series revolves around a carp called Bubbles and his friends.

Plot
Bubbles, a carp, lives in Carp Lake with his grandmother, who often tells him about the legendary, powerful ruler of the seas and the rivers: the Dragon, whom Bubbles idolises. One day, Bubbles encounters Evil Snake, who pretends that he is the Dragon King. Evil Snake and his two accomplices, Lobby and Bogart, accompany Bubbles to the lake, where Bubbles' grandmother suspects that he is an impostor. No one believes her at first until his "dragon horns" and fake skin slip from his body, and his identity is revealed.

In anger, Evil Snake turns Bubbles' grandmother into a bubble in a fierce fight. Angry, Bubbles searches for the real dragon to revive his grandmother, and avenge her death by finding the five dragon scales left by the Dragon in  order to beat Evil Snake. Along the way, he meets new friends, including the imposing Aku, the sassy Mei Mei, and the timid Erl, while Evil Snake and his henchmen relentlessly pursue Bubbles.

Main characters
Bubbles (泡泡) - Bubbles is a curious young carp with the ability to blow bubbles. He has been living with his grandmother, to whom he is very loyal. Bubbles meets Mei-Mei and Aku at a circus run by Mr. Octavio the octopus, who invites him perform in his circus. Bubbles is golden coloured and has red fins, and he grows wings when he activates the golden scale which is part of the five dragon scales that have the power of the dragon. He is loyal, brave and always stands up for what's right, but because he is so kind, he is sometimes duped by villains. Bubbles is the first to gain a scale which is the golden scale, which is loosely based on the Chinese Element Gold. The golden scale is activated when the phrase "My heart is like iron, and it is indestructable!" Bubbles also blows bubbles to confuse his enemies, to send messages, to create protective spheres, or just for fun.
 Aoqi (阿酷) - Sometimes called simply "Aku", Aoqi is a magician seahorse. Aoqi's parents were killed by Evil Snake when he was very young, and Mr Octavio later adopted him. Aoqi later learnt magic to defeat his foe. Aoqi is very smart, and when the gang finds themselves in sticky situations, he is usually the first to come up with a plan. He is depicted as pompous before joining the group, but stops after Bubbles saves his life. Aoqi is very kind despite his stern looks and bossy attitude.  Aoqi fights mostly with his wand, and has also been depicted in episodes as having great speed. Aoqi is the second one to gain a scale, which is the blue/water scale. It is activated when he says the phrase "Brave and resourceful, my heart flies free!" It upgradeds his wand so that it can turn into whatever Aku calls for.
 Xiao Mei Mei (小美美) is an anthropomorphic jellyfish. She is a singer who performs as the main star in Mr. Octavio's circus. She is sometimes depicted as a diva but tends to be the most forgiving and sensible of the group. She also likes anything that is cute and beautiful and hates things that are ugly. Mei Mei is the third one to gain a scale, which is the emerald scale. She activates it by singing unlike the other three, but occasionally has used the phrase "I am the voice of the ocean!" The activation of her chip causes here singing to be very powerful as it can calm down anything and stop it.
 Erl/Xuang Mian Gui (双面龟) is a timid turtle that has the ability to remove his shell, which is two-sided. He is the first one to befriend Bubbles. He had previously been forced to work for Evil Snake, but changed for the sake of his beloved Mei Mei and because he has grown to see Bubbles and Aku as his friends. Erl typically makes poor decisions, thinking that his actions will make Mei-Mei happy. He often exaggerates his abilities and inflates his exploits to new people they meet, but in reality is a coward who runs away from any kind of danger. This changes when he is given his own scale, the fire scale, after proving that he is brave. He activates it with the phrase "By the power of fire, give me strength!"  He gains the ability to control fire and every attack he makes is strengthened by fire.
Mr Octavio (章鱼) Mr Octavio is an octopus and the elderly ringleader of the "Dream Circus", where Aku and Mei Mei perform, and is more of a grandfather figure to Bubbles and a kind mentor. He was the first owner to get the golden scale in his youth, which he passes to Bubbles many years later. He is later captured by Evil Snake. Mr Octavio is not mentioned or appears in any episodes until the last quarter of the miniseries, where is turned into a monster and trapped in a trench, where he eats many of the fish. Fortunately, Bubbles and the gang released him from the spell eventually.
Giant Tortoise
 Evil Snake (癞皮蛇) is an anthropomorphic seasnake with boils on his body, who calls himself the Dragon King. He usually wears a fake blue skin which resembles a hood, dragon horns to look like one and a magic mirror to see things. It can shrink, and he usually wears it between his horns. When the snake heard about the five magic scales and that maybe they could turn him into a real dragon he sets up to find them but he didn't expect that Bubbles and his friends would try to get all the magic scales as well. He then later gains a powerful item known as the Poisonous Fang that was passed down by his ancestors, and is helped by his two generals Lobby and Bogart and then by his cousin Ray. Evil Snake has magical powers e.g. turning into a stone, and unleashing electric snakes. He used to work for the real dragon with Master Phoenix and Father Sea Monster before it died. He is finally defeated by Bubbles and friends when they jumped the Dragon's Gate.
 Lobby is one of the Evil Snake's generals, the other one being Bogart. He is a lobster which is the brains of the two as he is the one that makes up most of their plots to trick the gang. He and Bogart usually disguises themselves to trick Bubbles and the gang and gets a daily zap from their lord if they fail. He is also more deceitful than Bogart as he can be seen plotting a lot more to overthrow Evil Snake. He attacks by throwing claw-like projectiles but they temporarily melt in one episode when Mei Mei activates the emerald chip. He commands a group of small lobsters (they could be prawns) to patrol the area. He often masquerades as the 'White Jellyfish', and is killed when he falls into the lava with Bogart.
 Bogart is one of the Evil Snake's generals, the other one being Lobby. He is a fat catfish who acts as the brawn of the group. He doesn't usually understands what Lobby is thinking but is very suspicious of him being a traitor to their lord. He commands a group of pond loaches to spy on Lobby and patrol the area. He often masquerades as the 'Black Jellyfish, and is also killed when he argues with Lobby on who should jump over the Dragon Gate.
 Ray is a stingray and Evil Snake's cousin and a minor villain, who is later his second-in-command after he helps the Snake get the Poisonous Fang that belongs to their ancestors. He appears to the Snake just moments after Bubbles and the gang leaves the snake in the Coral Forest. He has been swallowed by the Evil Snake as he could not catch Bubbles and his gang.

Home media
The Adventures of Little Carp was released on VCD and DVD in 2006. It was also adapted as comic book, and as an educational book.

References

External links
  "Hong Kong advantages in the booming Mainland movie and TV scene", Hong Kong Trade Development Council, Sept. 14, 2007

Chinese children's animated television series
2000s animated television series
Television shows set in China
2007 Chinese television series debuts
China Central Television original programming
2007 Chinese television series endings
Mandarin-language television shows
Animated television series about fish